= Embates =

Scientific classification
- Kingdom: Animalia
- Phylum: Arthropoda
- Clade: Pancrustacea
- Class: Insecta
- Order: Coleoptera
- Suborder: Polyphaga
- Infraorder: Cucujiformia
- Superfamily: Curculionoidea
- Family: Curculionidae
- Genus: Embates; Chevrolat, L.A.A., 1833

Synonyms
- Ambatodes Voss, 1954; Ambatis Hustache, 1949

Genus of weevils

Embates is a genus of weevils. There are 49 species assigned to this genus.
